Sarah Schechter is the first female rabbi in the U.S. Air Force. She joined the Air Force as a chaplain candidate, and became a chaplain when she was ordained as a Reform rabbi in 2003. Her father was an Air Force chaplain in 1960.

She grew up in Manhattan, and decided to join the military immediately after the September 11 attacks, calling a recruiter on September 12. Her daughter Yael Emunah was born during her military service.

In 2013, she became the Jewish chaplain of the 11th Wing at Joint Base Andrews, Maryland, and was featured on the chaplain section of the Air Force website.

She wrote the piece "Personal Reflection: A Rabbi in the Military", which appears in the book The Sacred Calling: Four Decades of Women in the Rabbinate, published in 2016.

See also
Timeline of women rabbis
Women in Judaism

References

External links

Living people
Rabbis from New York City
Reform women rabbis
People from Manhattan
Women in the United States Air Force
United States Air Force chaplains
Rabbis in the military
American Reform rabbis
Year of birth missing (living people)
21st-century American rabbis